Psalm 126 is the 126th psalm of the Book of Psalms, beginning in English in the King James Version: "When the Lord turned again the captivity of Zion, we were like them that dream". In Latin, it is known as In convertendo Dominus. It is one of the fifteen Songs of Ascent in the Book of Psalms whose opening words in Hebrew are "Shir HaMaalot" (שיר המעלות בשוב ה’, a Song of Ascents). In the slightly different numbering system used in the Greek Septuagint version of the Bible and in the Latin  Vulgate, this psalm is Psalm 125.

This six-verse psalm forms a regular part of Jewish, Catholic, Lutheran, Anglican and other Protestant liturgies. It is well known in Judaism as the preliminary psalm recited before the Birkat Hamazon (Grace After Meals) on Shabbat and Jewish holidays, and as such is sung to a wide variety of melodies. It has also inspired hymns based on it, and has often been set to music, such as Jean-Philippe Rameau and Jules Van Nuffel who set the psalm in Latin.

Parts of this psalm have been singled out, for example They that sow in tears shall reap in joy is included in Ein deutsches Requiem by Johannes Brahms.

Background and themes

Psalm 126 expresses the themes of redemption and joy and gratitude to God. According to Matthew Henry, it was likely written upon the return of the Israelites from Babylonian captivity. In Henry's view, the psalm was written either by Ezra, who led the nation at that time, or by one of the Jewish prophets. Jewish scholarship pairs this psalm with Psalm 137, with Psalm 137 commemorating the beginning of the Babylonian exile, and Psalm 126 describing the end of that exile. The grammatical structure of the psalm, however, suggests that it is talking both about a past redemption (from Babylonian captivity, in verse 1) and a future redemption (the permanent return of the exiles at the end of days, in verse 4). Alternately, modern Jewish commentators suggest that the second half of the psalm refers to the redemption of the land of Israel from agricultural drought.

The Talmud (Ta'anit 23a) mentions this psalm in the context of the famous story of Honi ha-M'agel, who slept for seventy years. Before he fell asleep, Honi saw an old man planting a carob tree that would not bear fruit for seventy years. The Talmud begins,
Rabbi Yohanan said: This righteous man [Honi HaMa'agel] was troubled throughout the whole of his life about the meaning of the verse from Psalms 126, "A Song of Ascents, When the Lord brought back those that returned to Zion, we will be like dreamers." He wondered: Is it possible for one man to live long enough to dream continuously for seventy years? [As it is written, "For the Lord said: When Babylon's seventy years are over, I will take note of and I will fulfill you to my promise of favor -- to bring you back to this place" (Jeremiah 29:10).]
Honi then ate a meal and fell asleep for seventy years. When he awoke, he saw the man's grandson gathering the fruits of the carob tree. Honi returned to the study hall and heard scholars discussing laws that he himself had explicated. But they did not believe that he was still alive, and did not show him honor.

Alexander Kirkpatrick notes an affinity of this psalm with Psalm 85, which begins , thou hast been favourable unto thy land".Kirkpatrick, A., Cambridge Bible for Schools and Colleges on Psalm 126, accessed 9 June 2022

Text
Hebrew Bible version
Following is the Hebrew text of Psalm 126:

King James Version
 When the Lord turned again the captivity of Zion, we were like them that dream.
 Then was our mouth filled with laughter, and our tongue with singing: then said they among the heathen, The Lord hath done great things for them.
 The Lord hath done great things for us; whereof we are glad.
 Turn again our captivity, O Lord, as the streams in the south.
 They that sow in tears shall reap in joy.
 He that goeth forth and weepeth, bearing precious seed, shall doubtless come again with rejoicing, bringing his sheaves with him.

Other translations
The New International Version and the Revised Standard Version refer to "the south" in verse 4 as "the Negev".

Uses
Judaism
Psalm 126 is customarily recited before the Birkat Hamazon (Grace After Meals) on Shabbat, Rosh Chodesh, and Jewish holidays. Some say it on other  days when Tachanun is not said. While on ordinary weekdays, Psalm 137 is traditionally recited before the Birkat Hamazon, that psalm's theme of the Destruction of the Temple is considered inappropriate for joyous occasions and holidays. For this reason, Psalm 126 is said before the Birkat Hamazon on Shabbat and Jewish holidays, as well as at other celebratory meals such as those at a Jewish wedding, brit milah, and pidyon haben. 

At these times, Psalm 126 is customarily sung in full. The psalm lends itself to a wide variety of melodies due to its simple, repeating structure, and as such has many musical versions popularized by synagogue groups, youth organizations, summer camps, and others. Melodies have been borrowed from other liturgical poems, such as El Adon. German-speaking Jews have a tradition of adapting the liturgical melodies of each holiday's synagogue services to the singing of Psalm 126 at the table.  Whereas fifteen psalms begin with the Masoretic superscription "Shir Hama'alot" (Song of Ascents), Psalm 126 is eponymously called "Shir Hama'alot" due to its prevalent use.

Psalm 126 is one of the 15 Songs of Ascents recited after the Shabbat afternoon prayer in the period between Sukkot and Shabbat HaGadol (the Shabbat prior to Passover).

Verse 4 is part of Selichot.

Catholic Church
According to the Rule of St. Benedict of 530, this Psalm was assigned to the Office of none from Tuesday until Saturday, and following Psalm 127 and Psalm 128.

Currently, in the Liturgy of the Hours, Psalm 126 is recited or sung at vespers on the Wednesday of the third week of the four weekly liturgical cycle. In the liturgy of the Mass, it is read on the 30th Sunday in Ordinary Time of the year B6, the second Sunday of Advent and 5th Sunday of Lent that year.

Pentecostal
This psalm is a Psalm of praise. It is used in moments of praise and to remind the Pentecostal community that redemption is coming and when it comes, you may not believe it - we were like those who dream!

Secular usage
In keeping with its theme of redemption, Psalm 126 was proposed by Religious Zionists to be the national anthem of the State of Israel. It, along with at least eleven other proposals, was ultimately passed over in favor of "Hatikvah", which was ratified as the official national anthem in 2004. 

Israeli Prime Minister Menachem Begin recited Psalm 126 on the White House lawn when he signed the second of the Camp David Accords with Egyptian President Anwar Sadat on March 26, 1979.

Musical settings

The complete psalm was set in Latin as a motet for a cappella choir by composers including George de La Hèle, Lorenzo Perosi, Jean-Noël Marchand, Dmitri Bortnyansky (1777). Marc-Antoine Charpentier compose in 1670 one "In convertendo Dominus", H.169, for soloists, double chorus, strings and continuo. Also, Sébastien de Brossard, Michel-Richard de Lalande, Patrick Douglas.Neil McDermott, "We Were Glad - In Memoriam Dr Stuart Campbell by The University of Glasgow Chapel Choir", in Bandcamp, accessed 5 October 2018.  Jean-Philippe Rameau composed In convertendo Dominus c. 1710, for choir and orchestra. Jules Van Nuffel wrote a setting for mixed choir and organ as his Op. 32 in 1926. Giovanni Bernardino Nanino set alternate verses for a cappella choir.

German settings were made by Heinrich Schütz, Johann Hermann Schein and Heinrich Hartmann. Verses 5 and 6 were set by Johannes Brahms within the first movement of Ein deutsches Requiem, for choir and orchestra. Friedrich Kiel set the verses 5 and 6 as No. 5 of his Six Motets, Op. 82, published in 1883. 

Johann Sebastian Bach used the second verse in German as the text for the opening movement of his Christmas cantata Unser Mund sei voll Lachens, BWV 110 (1725).

Verses of the psalm have been set in English by composers including William Byrd and Charles Villiers Stanford. Jules van Nuffel set the complete psalm in Latin, In convertendo Dominus'', in 1926.

In 1998, Philip Glass composed a setting in which the chorus sings worldless syllables and a narrator recites the text in English.

The psalm is also sung to secular melodies such as "Waltzing Matilda", "The Longest Time","It's a Small World", Beethoven's Ninth, and college football songs, among many others.

Sons of Korah included a setting of Psalm 126 on their 2000 album, "Redemption Songs."

The psalm inspired the hymn Bringing in the Sheaves, the lyrics were written in 1874 by Knowles Shaw,  now usually set to a tune by George Minor, written in 1880.

See also
 Preliminary Psalms

References

Sources

External links 

 
 
 Psalms Chapter 126 text in Hebrew and English, mechon-mamre.org
 Psalm 126 – Amazed at God’s Work text and detailed commentary, enduringword.com
 A song of ascents. / When the LORD restored the captives of Zion text and footnotes, usccb.org United States Conference of Catholic Bishops
 Psalm 126:1 introduction and text, biblestudytools.com
 Charles H. Spurgeon: Psalm 126 detailed commentary, archive.spurgeon.org
 Psalm 126 / Refrain: The Lord has indeed done great things for us. Church of England
 Psalm 126 at biblegateway.com
Hymnary.org, Hymns for Psalm 126

126